This article features the 1998 UEFA European Under-18 Championship qualifying stage. Matches were played 1997 through 1998. Two qualifying rounds were organised and seven teams qualified for the main tournament, joining host Cyprus.

First round

Group 1
All matches were played in Portugal.

Group 2
All matches were played in the Czech Republic.

Group 3

Group 4
All matches were played in Moldova.

Group 5

Group 6
All matches were played in France.

Group 7
All matches were played in Malta.

Group 8
All matches were played in Northern Ireland.

Group 9
All matches were played in Israel.

Group 10

Group 11
All matches were played in Finland.

Group 12
All matches were played in Sweden.

Group 13
All matches were played in Norway.

Group 14
All matches were played in Germany.

Second round

|}

See also
 1998 UEFA European Under-18 Championship

External links
Results by RSSSF

UEFA European Under-19 Championship qualification
Qual